300% is the debut studio album by the Dutch three-piece girl group Lisa, Amy & Shelley. It was released in the Netherlands on the 2 June 2008 by Dino Music and EMI. The album peaked at number 26 on the Dutch Albums Chart. The album includes the singles "Adem in, adem uit", "Zet 'M Op!" and "Strand".

Singles
"Adem in, adem uit" was released as the lead single from the album in October 2007. The song peaked at number 55 on the Dutch Singles Chart. "Zet 'M Op!" was released as the second single from the album in May 2008. The song peaked at number 60 on the Dutch Singles Chart. "Strand"  was released as the third single from the album in 2008.

Track listing

Charts

Weekly charts

Release history

References

2008 albums
Dutch-language albums